Year 107 (CVII) was a common year starting on Friday (link will display the full calendar) of the Julian calendar. At the time, it was known as the Year of the Consulship of Sura and Senico (or, less frequently, year 860 Ab urbe condita). The denomination 107 for this year has been used since the early medieval period, when the Anno Domini calendar era became the prevalent method in Europe for naming years.

Events

By place

Roman Empire 
 Lucius Licinius Sura and Quintus Sosius Senecio become consuls of Rome.
 An Indian ambassador is received by Emperor Trajan.

Asia 
 First year of the yongchu era of the Chinese Eastern Han Dynasty.
 Han Andi (An-ti) becomes emperor of China.
</onlyinclude>

Deaths 
 Titus Avidius Quietus, Roman politician and governor

References